Herman van Staveren (26 January 1849 – 24 January 1930) was a notable Dutch-born New Zealand rabbi and philanthropist. He was born in Bolsward, Netherlands, in 1849.

References

1849 births
1930 deaths
People from Bolsward
Jewish philanthropists
New Zealand Jews
Dutch emigrants to New Zealand
Dutch rabbis
New Zealand philanthropists
New Zealand rabbis
New Zealand people of Dutch-Jewish descent
Wellington Hospital Board members